Dámaso de Toro was mayor of Ponce, Puerto Rico, in 1701.

Mayoral term
In 1701 the Rebellion of San German took place. The Rebellion was a conflict between the Captaincy General of Puerto Rico and the residents of San Germán, Coamo, Ponce, Aguada and other poblados in the western region of Puerto Rico that, at the time, were politically dependent on San Germán. The rebellion arose as a result of the governor ordering Juan Torres Figueroa, sargento mayor of Ponce at the time, to ready 100 men to march to San Juan should it be necessary during a crisis.

Legacy
There is a street in Urbanización Las Delicias of Barrio Magueyes in Ponce named after him.

See also

 List of Puerto Ricans
 List of mayors of Ponce, Puerto Rico

References

Year of birth unknown
Year of death unknown
Mayors of Ponce, Puerto Rico